Giovan Battista Serbelloni  was a Roman Catholic prelate who served as Bishop of Cassano all'Jonio (1561–1579).

Biography
On 17 Dec 1561, Giovan Battista Serbelloni was appointed during the papacy of Pope Pius IV as Bishop of Cassano all'Jonio. On 6 Apr 1567, he was consecrated bishop by Thomas Goldwell, Bishop of Saint Asaph, with Ippolito Capilupo, Bishop Emeritus of Fano, and Ventura Buralini, Bishop of Massa Marittima, serving as co-consecrators. He served as Bishop of Cassano all'Jonio until his resignation in 1579.

While bishop, he was the principal consecrator of Giuliano de' Medici (bishop), Bishop of Béziers (1567).

References

External links and additional sources
 (for Chronology of Bishops) 
 (for Chronology of Bishops)  

16th-century Italian Roman Catholic bishops
Bishops appointed by Pope Pius IV